L. H. Sudath Manjula (born 10 December 1972) is a Sri Lankan politician and Member of Parliament.

Manjula was born on 10 December 1972. He was educated at Ruwanwella Rajasinghe Maha Vidyalaya.

Manjula was a member of Ruwanwella Divisional Council. He was arrested in December 2013 over an alleged assault of a Department of Archaeology employee. He contested the 2020 parliamentary election as a Sri Lanka People's Freedom Alliance electoral alliance candidate in Kegalle District and was elected to the Parliament of Sri Lanka.

References

1972 births
Local authority councillors of Sri Lanka
Living people
Members of the 16th Parliament of Sri Lanka
Prisoners and detainees of Sri Lanka
Sinhalese politicians
Sri Lankan Buddhists
Sri Lankan prisoners and detainees
Sri Lanka People's Freedom Alliance politicians
Sri Lanka Podujana Peramuna politicians